In trigonometry, the law of cosines (also known as the cosine formula, cosine rule, or al-Kashi's theorem) relates the lengths of the sides of a triangle to the cosine of one of its angles. Using notation as in Fig. 1, the law of cosines states

For the same figure, the other two relations are analogous:

The law of cosines generalizes the Pythagorean theorem, which holds only for right triangles: if the angle  is a right angle (of measure 90 degrees, or  radians), then , and thus the law of cosines reduces to the Pythagorean theorem:

The law of cosines is useful for computing the third side of a triangle when two sides and their enclosed angle are known.

History

Though the notion of the cosine was not yet developed in Euclid's time, his Elements, dating back to the 3rd century BC, contains an early geometric theorem almost equivalent to the law of cosines. The cases of obtuse triangles and acute triangles (corresponding to the two cases of negative or positive cosine) are treated separately, in Propositions 12 and 13 of Book 2. Trigonometric functions and algebra (in particular negative numbers) being absent in Euclid's time, the statement has a more geometric flavor:

Using notation as in Fig. 2, Euclid's statement can be represented by the formula

This formula may be transformed into the law of cosines by noting that . Proposition 13 contains an entirely analogous statement for acute triangles.

Euclid's Elements paved the way for the discovery of law of cosines. In the 15th century, Jamshīd al-Kāshī, a Persian mathematician and astronomer, provided the first explicit statement of the law of cosines in a form suitable for triangulation. He provided accurate trigonometric tables and expressed the theorem in a form suitable for modern usage. As of the 2020s, in France, the law of cosines is still referred to as the Formule d'Al-Kashi.

The theorem was popularized in the Western world by François Viète in the 16th century. At the beginning of the 19th century, modern algebraic notation allowed the law of cosines to be written in its current symbolic form.

Uses

The theorem is used in triangulation, for solving a triangle or circle, i.e., to find (see Figure 3):
the third side of a triangle if one knows two sides and the angle between them: 
the angles of a triangle if one knows the three sides: 
the third side of a triangle if one knows two sides and an angle opposite to one of them (one may also use the Pythagorean theorem to do this if it is a right triangle): 

It is even possible to obtain a result slightly greater than one for the cosine of an angle.

The third formula shown is the result of solving for a in the quadratic equation . This equation can have 2, 1, or 0 positive solutions corresponding to the number of possible triangles given the data. It will have two positive solutions if , only one positive solution if , and no solution if . These different cases are also explained by the side-side-angle congruence ambiguity.

Proofs

Using the distance formula

This triangle can be placed on the Cartesian coordinate system with side  aligned along the x axis and angle  placed at the origin, by plotting the components of the 3 points of the triangle as shown in Fig. 4:

By the distance formula, 

Squaring both sides and simplifying 

An advantage of this proof is that it does not require the consideration of different cases for when the triangle is acute, right, or obtuse.

Using trigonometry

Dropping the perpendicular onto the side  through point , an altitude of the triangle, shows (see Fig. 5)
 

Multiplying through by  yields

Considering the two other altitudes of the triangle yields

Adding the latter two equations gives

Subtracting the first equation from the last one results in

which simplifies to

This proof uses trigonometry in that it treats the cosines of the various angles as quantities in their own right. It uses the fact that the cosine of an angle expresses the relation between the two sides enclosing that angle in any right triangle. Other proofs (below) are more geometric in that they treat an expression such as  merely as a label for the length of a certain line segment.

Many proofs deal with the cases of obtuse and acute angles  separately.

Using the Pythagorean theorem

Case of an obtuse angle
Euclid proved this theorem by applying the Pythagorean theorem to each of the two right triangles in Fig. 2 ( and ).

and triangle  gives

Expanding the first equation gives

Substituting the second equation into this, the following can be obtained:

This is Euclid's Proposition 12 from Book 2 of the Elements. To transform it into the modern form of the law of cosines, note that

Case of an acute angle
Euclid's proof of his Proposition 13 proceeds along the same lines as his proof of Proposition 12: he applies the Pythagorean theorem to both right triangles formed by dropping the perpendicular onto one of the sides enclosing the angle  and uses the square of a difference to simplify.

Another proof in the acute case
Using more trigonometry, the law of cosines can be deduced by using the Pythagorean theorem only once. In fact, by using the right triangle on the left hand side of Fig. 6 it can be shown that:

using the trigonometric identity 

This proof needs a slight modification if . In this case, the right triangle to which the Pythagorean theorem is applied moves outside the triangle . The only effect this has on the calculation is that the quantity  is replaced by  As this quantity enters the calculation only through its square, the rest of the proof is unaffected.

Referring to Fig. 6 it is worth noting that if the angle opposite side  is  then:

This is useful for direct calculation of a second angle when two sides and an included angle are given.

Using Ptolemy's theorem

Referring to the diagram, triangle ABC with sides  = ,  =  and  =  is drawn inside its circumcircle as shown. Triangle  is constructed congruent to triangle  with  =  and  = . Then:

Now the law of cosines is rendered by a straightforward application of Ptolemy's theorem to cyclic quadrilateral :

Plainly if angle  is right, then  is a rectangle and application of Ptolemy's theorem yields the Pythagorean theorem:

By comparing areas
One can also prove the law of cosines by calculating areas. The change of sign as the angle  becomes obtuse makes a case distinction necessary.

Recall that

Acute case. Figure 7a shows a heptagon cut into smaller pieces (in two different ways) to yield a proof of the law of cosines. The various pieces are
in blue, the triangle , on the left and on the right;

The equality of areas on the left and on the right gives

Obtuse case. Figure 7b cuts a hexagon in two different ways into smaller pieces, yielding a proof of the law of cosines in the case that the angle  is obtuse. We have
in blue, the triangle  twice, on the left, as well as on the right.

The equality of areas on the left and on the right gives

The rigorous proof will have to include proofs that various shapes are congruent and therefore have equal area. This will use the theory of congruent triangles.

Using geometry of the circle
Using the geometry of the circle, it is possible to give a more geometric proof than using the Pythagorean theorem alone. Algebraic manipulations (in particular the binomial theorem) are avoided.

Case of acute angle , where . Drop the perpendicular from  onto  = , creating a line segment of length . Duplicate the right triangle to form the isosceles triangle . Construct the circle with center  and radius , and its tangent  through . The tangent  forms a right angle with the radius  (Euclid's Elements: Book 3, Proposition 18; or see here), so the yellow triangle in Figure 8 is right. Apply  the Pythagorean theorem to obtain

Then use the tangent secant theorem (Euclid's Elements: Book 3, Proposition 36), which says that the square on the tangent through a point  outside the circle is equal to the product of the two lines segments (from ) created by any secant of the circle through . In the present case: , or

Substituting into the previous equation gives the law of cosines:

Note that  is the power of the point  with respect to the circle. The use of the Pythagorean theorem and the tangent secant theorem can be replaced by a single application of the power of a point theorem.

Case of acute angle , where . Drop the perpendicular from  onto  = , creating a line segment of length . Duplicate the right triangle to form the isosceles triangle . Construct the circle with center  and radius , and a chord through  perpendicular to  half of which is  Apply  the Pythagorean theorem to obtain

Now use the chord theorem (Euclid's Elements: Book 3, Proposition 35), which says that if two chords intersect, the product of the two line segments obtained on one chord is equal to the product of the two line segments obtained on the other chord. In the present case:  or

Substituting into the previous equation gives the law of cosines:

Note that the power of the point  with respect to the circle has the negative value .

Case of obtuse angle . This proof uses the power of a point theorem directly, without the auxiliary triangles obtained by constructing a tangent or a chord. Therefore,

which is the law of cosines.

Using algebraic measures for line segments (allowing negative numbers as lengths of segments) the case of obtuse angle and acute angle can be treated simultaneously.

Using the law of sines
By using the law of sines and knowing that the angles of a triangle must sum to 180 degrees, we have the following system of equations (the three unknowns are the angles):

Then, by using the third equation of the system, we obtain a system of two equations in two variables:

where we have used the trigonometric property that the sine of a supplementary angle is equal to the sine of the angle.

Using the identity (see Angle sum and difference identities)

leads to

Hence, from the first equation of the system, we can obtain

By substituting this expression into the second equation and by using 

we can obtain one equation with one variable:

This implies

Recalling the Pythagorean identity, we obtain the law of cosines:

Using vectors 
Denote

Therefore,
 

Taking the dot product of each side with itself:

Using the identity (see Dot product) 

leads to

The result follows.

Isosceles case
When , i.e., when the triangle is isosceles with the two sides incident to the angle  equal, the law of cosines simplifies significantly. Namely, because , the law of cosines becomes

or

Analogue for tetrahedra
Denote the dihedral angles by  etc. Then

Version suited to small angles
In situations where this is an important concern, a mathematically equivalent version of the law of cosines, similar to the haversine formula, can prove useful:

In the limit of an infinitesimal angle, the law of cosines degenerates into the circular arc length formula, .

In spherical and hyperbolic geometry

Versions similar to the law of cosines for the Euclidean plane also hold on a unit sphere and in a hyperbolic plane.

In hyperbolic geometry, a pair of equations are collectively known as the hyperbolic law of cosines. The first is

Unified formula for surfaces of constant curvature 
 and 

allows to unify the formulae for plane, sphere and pseudosphere into:

In this notation  is a complex number, representing the surface's radius of curvature.
For  the surface is a sphere of radius , and its constant curvature equals 

for   the surface is a pseudosphere of (imaginary) radius  with constant curvature 

for  : the surface tends to a Euclidean plane, with constant zero curvature.

Verifying the formula for non-Euclidean geometry

Hence, for a sphere of radius 
 .

Likewise, for a pseudosphere of radius 

Indeed,  and 

Verifying the formula in the limit of Euclidean geometry

In the Euclidean plane the appropriate limits for the above equation must be calculated:

and
.

Applying this to the general formula for a finite  yields:

See also
Half-side formula
Law of sines
Law of tangents
Law of cotangents
List of trigonometric identities
Mollweide's formula
Solution of triangles
Triangulation

References

External links

 
 Several derivations of the Cosine Law, including Euclid's at cut-the-knot
 Interactive applet of Law of Cosines

Trigonometry
Angle
Articles containing proofs
Theorems about triangles